The contra-alto clarinet, E♭ contrabass clarinet, is a large clarinet pitched a perfect fifth below the B♭ bass clarinet. It is a transposing instrument in E♭ sounding an octave and a major sixth below its written pitch, between the bass clarinet and the B♭ contrabass clarinet.

The contra-alto clarinet is often used in clarinet choirs and ensembles of clarinets and saxophones. It may also be present in a wind band. The repertoire for contra-alto clarinet in the symphony orchestra is limited. In ensembles it is usually used in unison with the other woodwind instruments, such as (bassoon, bass clarinet and contrabass clarinet), or it plays the lower octave in addition.

History 

The contra-alto clarinet is largely a development of the 2nd half of the 20th century, although there were some precursors in the 19th century:

 In 1829, an instrument maker in Göttingen, introduced an instrument tuned in F in the shape and fingering of a basset horn, which could be called a contrabasset horn because it played an octave lower than it.
 Around 1890 the Belgian clarinet maker Eugène Albert or his son E. J. Albert also developed an alto clarinet in F, but without the additional basset notes typical of the basset horn notated C to it.
 In 1851, Adolphe Sax applied for a patent<ref>Description des machines et procédés spécifiés dans les brevets d'invention, publ. par C.P. Molard. [With] Table générale des vingt premiers volumes. [Continued as] Description des machines ... pour lesquels des brevets d'invention ont été pris sous le régime de la loi du 5 juillet 1844 Ministère de l'agriculture et du commerce, Description des machines et procédés spécifiés dans les brevets d'invention pour lesquels des brevets d'invention ont été pris sous le régime de la loi du 5. juillet 1844 (Description of the machines and processes specified in the patents for which patents have been taken out under the law of 5 July 1844).</ref>    for an instrument, he called "contrabass clarinet in E♭" in order to replace the bowed contrabass of symphony orchestras in wind bands with an instrument whose lowest sounding note is contra-G or G1, like the contrabass. This is the case with a contra clarinet tuned in E♭, whose written lowest tone is the small E♭ (E-flat3), as with most clarinets. The pitch of this instrument today identifies it as a contra alto clarinet. However, it never came onto the market.
 Around 1880 the Italian clarinet maker Alessandro Maldura built a contra alto clarinet in E of grenadilla wood with 14 keys, 1.93 m long, which he called Clarone grande, exhibited at the 1881 Italian National Exhibition in Milan.

20th century

  built two models of a contra-alto clarinet in E-flat, Model 350 and 352, from metal. Model 350 was in a curved shape (known as a paperclip) and went to written low C. These models also have three trill keys on the right side of the upper joint. The curved shape makes the instrument much easier to transport than the traditional straight, non-dismantled model. Model 352 was straight in a bass clarinet-shape to written low E♭.

Other makers of contra-alto clarinets have developed mainly stretched models. These include:

 Henri Selmer Paris
 Model 26/40 in rosewood to written E, E♭, or D
 Buffet Crampon
 Metal model patented in 1891 for Evette and Schaeffer (patent FR218373/5)
 Model Prestige 1553 made of grenadilla, 19 keys.
 Conn-Selmer USA (1980 onwards), Bundy (from 1970 to 1980), Buescher ( 1968–1969): model 1440 made of ebonite, to written  E♭ (written), with 18 keys and 7 plateau keys. 
 Leblanc USA / Vito: Model L7181 in Reso-Tone material to E flat (written).
 Ripamonti, Italian manufacturer: model 322 in rosewood, to d (written).
 Martin Frères Company
 EE-3488 model in ABS
 EE-3434 model in ebonite

Today's contra-alto clarinets are mainly based on the Boehm system, although models with the German system also existed in the past.

 Description and technique 

The range of most contra-alto clarinets extends downwards to its low E♭ (concert G♭1). Some models go down to D (concert F1) or C (concert E♭1). For this the instrument must be longer and have additional keys which the player operates with the right thumb and/or little fingers (as with the basset horn). In the altissimo range, the fingerings on the contra-alto clarinet are sometimes different from those on the higher clarinets.

Modern contra-alto clarinets have a double (or even triple) automatic stop key. 

The contra-alto clarinet has a curved bell, mainly made of metal, which is necessary for sound projection. It is located in the lowest part of the instrument. On the curved clarinets ("paper clip") the bell is in the upper part of the instrument.

The instrument can be played sitting down or standing up with the help of a peg or a strap.

In orchestration, the contra-alto clarinet's playing is as fast as that of the bass clarinet. Unlike other low wind instruments (contrabassoon, tuba, ...) it can play a wide range of nuances from "fff" to "ppp" and articulations ("legato", "staccato", slap, ...). In contemporary music, composers use its ability to produce polyphonic sounds. 

 Length 
The length of the tube (without bell) ranges from about 190 centimeters for a contra-alto clarinet, which lowest written tone is E♭, and up to about 230 centimeters for an instrument down to C.

 Repertoire 

As the contra-alto clarinet is a relatively young instrument, its repertoire is limited and much smaller than that of the contrabass clarinet. It is represented in all musical styles that emerged after the end of the 19th century, from neoclassicism, New Music, jazz and contemporary music to experimental rock. 

In the mid-1960s, pieces in which contra-alto clarinets were also used were said to be heard even from the loudspeakers of small television sets. The instrument was also in Hollywood: early episodes of The Twilight Zone, Star Trek 

Given the limited written repertoire in orchestras and ensembles, contra-alto clarinets can play in unison with other low wind instruments or provide a foundation in the lower octave to the woodwinds playing higher (organ pedal effect).

Parts for baritone saxophone in E♭ for wind bands can also be used for contra-alto clarinet. There are also transcriptions and transpositions of pieces written for low instruments in C, such as double bass, bass guitar, bassoon, and tuba.

In the publishing houses, part of the repertoire of the contra-alto clarinet is shared with that of the contrabass clarinet.

 Neoclassicism 
 Lien, Fantastic Scherzo with Piano.
 Siennicki, Nocturne with piano.
 Bret Newton, Three Songs for Contra Alto Clarinet and Piano.

 Contemporary solo and chamber music 
 Zeno Baldi: copia carbone for ensemble incl. contralto clarinet and electronics
 Chris Dench: Funk for contralto clarinet and percussion
 Bernhard Lang: Das Hirn for soprano and ensemble incl. ossia part for contralto clarinet

 Clarinet ensemble 

 Dick Hyman, Sextet for Clarinets.

 Wind orchestra 
 Lucien Cailliet is known for his arrangements for wind orchestra and clarinet ensemble, combining over 6 octaves of different clarinets from the E♭ sopranino to the contra-alto clarinet. The contra-alto clarinet is regularly used in professional wind orchestras.

Americans became aware of the importance of instrumentation during the 20th century to give instruments such as the contra-alto clarinet a place in the brass band (in English military band or concert band).

 Arrangements 
There are arrangements for this instrument drawn from the repertoire for other low wind instruments (tuba, bassoon, ...).
 Andrea Catozzi, Beelzebub (Varied programme for tuba solo).

 CD recordings with contra-alto clarinet 
Recordings in which the contra-alto clarinettist appears as a soloist or chamber musician are extremely rare. A compact disc of duets for contra-alto and contrabass clarinets was recorded in 2018.
 Brandon Evans, Solo Contra Alto Clarinet (Live in Brussels, 1999) (CD, 2001, Parallactic Recordings label).
 Alberto Pinton, Mirror for Contra-Alto Clarinet in the album The Visible, (CD, 2005, Moserobie, MMP, CD022).
 Teppo Salakaa, Fragmented Visions (CD, 2018).
 Jason Alder and Piotr Michalowski, Contradictions: Duets for Contrabass and Contra-Alto Clarinets (CD, 2019, Creative Sources Recordings label, CS602).
 Denis Colin, Quiet men (CD, 2019, label Faubourg du Monde).
 Brian Landrus.
 Richard F. Dixon.
 John Linnell, with his band They Might Be Giants, Nanobots (CD, 2013, Lojinx label).
 Damien Sabatier, with his band Impérial Quartet, GRAND CARNAVAL'' (CD, 2016, Inouïe Distribution label).

Bibliography

References

External links 

 
 

Clarinets
Jazz instruments
Orchestral instruments